Louis Émile Wartel (31 March 1834, Paris – 5 May 1907, Paris) was an opera singer and teacher active in Paris. He was the son of the musicians François Wartel and Thérèse Wartel.

Life and career
Wartel was an established singer at the Théâtre Lyrique in Paris from 1858 until 1868, creating many baritone roles in new operas premiered there.

His repertoire was:

1858
Valère in Le médecin malgré lui (premiere)
Bartholo in Les noces de Figaro
Lysandre in L'agneau de Chloé (premiere)
Gambara in Le harpe d'or (premiere)
1859
Omar in Abou Hassan
l’Agent de Cardinal Mazarin in Les petits violons du roi (premiere)
1860
le Docteur Sangrado in Gil Blas (premiere)
le Marquis de Panillac in Les valets de Gascogne (premiere)
Père Richard in L'auberge des Ardennes (premiere)
Monsieur Oronte in Crispin, rival de son maitre (premiere)
le Capitaine Barbagallo in Les pêcheurs de Catane (premiere)
1861
Magnus and Astaroth in Astaroth (premiere)
Monsieur d’Assonvilliers in Madame Grégoire (premiere)
Badroulboudour in Les deux cadis (premiere)
Kaloum in La statue (premiere)
le Marquis in Le café du roi
Placidus in La nuit aux gondoles (premiere)
Don Gregorio in Le tête enchantée (premiere)

1862
Utobal in Joseph
l'Ogre de la forêt in La chatte merveilleuse (premiere)
1863
Don Armado in Peines d'amours perdues
Sparafucile in Rigoletto
1864
Ambroise in Mireille (premiere)
Le baron in Violetta
Le docteur in Le cousin Babylas (premiere)
1865
Candaule in Le roi Candaule (premiere)
Le bourgmestre in Lisbeth ou la Cinquantaine
Lord Tristan in Martha
1866
Ford in Les joyeuses commères de Windsor
Van Daff in Les dragées de Suzette (premiere)
1867
le Duc de Vérone in Roméo et Juliette (premiere)
Simon Glover in La jolie fille de Perth (premiere)
1868
Pandolphe in L'irato
Toby in Le brasseur de Preston

References

1834 births
1907 deaths
French operatic baritones
Singers from Paris
19th-century French male opera singers
Voice teachers